Haplochromis decticostoma is a species of cichlid endemic to Lake Victoria.  This species grows to a length of  SL.

References

decticostoma
Fish described in 1969
Taxonomy articles created by Polbot